Eaton's Building may refer to:
 Eaton's Annex, Toronto, Ontario; demolished
 Eaton's Building (Saskatoon), Saskatchewan
 Eaton's Place, Winnipeg, Manitoba, now CityPlace
 Toronto Eaton Centre, Toronto, Ontario